Artemio Lomboy Rillera, S.V.D. (May 1, 1947 – November 13, 2011) was the Roman Catholic bishop of the Roman Catholic Diocese of San Fernando de La Union, Philippines.

Ordained to the priesthood in 1970, Rillera became a bishop in 1993 dying in office.

Events 
The significant events in Lomboy Rillera's life are outlined below:

Notes

20th-century Roman Catholic bishops in the Philippines
1947 births
2011 deaths
21st-century Roman Catholic bishops in the Philippines